Nocardioides montaniterrae is a bacterium from the genus Nocardioides which has been isolated from mountain soil.

References 

montaniterrae
Bacteria described in 2015